Mir Shabbir Ali Bijarani (Sindhi: مير شبير علي بجاراڻي؛; born 20 April 1973) is a Pakistani politician who is the current Provincial Minister of Sindh for Mines and Mineral Development, in office since 19 August 2018. He has been a member of the Provincial Assembly of Sindh since August 2018. Previously he was a member of the National Assembly of Pakistan from June 2013 to May 2018.

Early life and education
He was born on 20 April 1973 to Hazar Khan Bijarani in Jacobabad, Pakistan.

He has done graduation.

Political career

He became district nazim of Jacobabad district after defeating Sardar Muqeem Khoso in the local bodies election in 2001. He served as nazim of Jacobabad until the district was bifurcated in December 2004.

He ran for the seat of the National Assembly of Pakistan as an independent candidate from Constituency NA-209 (Jacobabad-cum-Kashmore) in 2008 Pakistani general election but was unsuccessful. He received 248 votes and lost the seat to Hazar Khan Bijarani.

He was elected to the National Assembly as a candidate of Pakistan Peoples Party (PPP) from Constituency NA-209 (Jacobabad-cum-Kashmore) in 2013 Pakistani general election. He received 54,881 votes and defeated Mir Hassan Khoso, a candidate of Pakistan Muslim League (F) (PML-F).

He was elected to the Provincial Assembly of Sindh as a candidate of PPP from PS-6 Kashmore-III in the 2018 Sindh provincial election.

On 19 August 2018, he was inducted into the provincial Sindh cabinet of Chief Minister Syed Murad Ali Shah and was made Provincial Minister of Sindh for Mines & Mineral Development.

References

Living people
Pakistan People's Party MPAs (Sindh)
Pakistani MNAs 2013–2018
People from Sindh
1973 births
Pakistan People's Party MNAs